Catocala dejecta, the dejected underwing,  is a moth of the family Erebidae. It is found from Massachusetts and Connecticut south through New Jersey to Florida, west to Texas and Oklahoma and north to southern Ontario.

The wingspan is 56–73 mm. Adults are on wing from June to October depending on the location.

The larvae feed on Carya glabra, Carya ovata and Quercus species.

References

External links
Species info
Bug Guide

dejecta
Moths of North America
Moths described in 1880